Verchères—Les Patriotes (formerly Verchères) was a federal electoral district in Quebec, Canada, that was represented in the House of Commons of Canada from 1979 until the 2012 electoral redistribution.

Geography

The riding runs along the Saint Lawrence River east of Montreal, in the Quebec region of Montérégie. It consists of the Marguerite-D'Youville Regional County Municipality, the northern part of the La Vallée-du-Richelieu Regional County Municipality, and the eastern part of the city of Boucherville.

The neighbouring ridings are  Bas-Richelieu—Nicolet—Bécancour,  Saint-Hyacinthe—Bagot, Chambly—Borduas, Saint-Bruno—Saint-Hubert, Longueuil—Pierre-Boucher, La Pointe-de-l'Île, Repentigny and Berthier—Maskinongé.

History

Verchères riding was created by the British North America Act of 1867. In 1893, it was merged into Chambly—Verchères.

In 1976, the riding of "Verchères" was recreated from parts of Chambly and St. Hyacinthe ridings. In 1998, it was renamed "Verchères—Les Patriotes".

The district seat was vacant starting from November 9, 2005, when Stéphane Bergeron stepped down to join provincial politics. No by-election was called before the 2006 election was called for January 23, 2006; Bloc candidate Luc Malo won that election.

This riding was redistributed into the new ridings of Pierre-Boucher—Les Patriotes—Verchères and Montarville in the 2012 electoral redistribution.

Members of Parliament

This riding has elected the following Members of Parliament:

Election results

Verchères—Les Patriotes, 2004–2015

	

					
Note: Conservative vote is compared to the total of the Canadian Alliance vote and Progressive Conservative vote in 2000 election.

Verchères, 1979-2000

See also
 List of Canadian federal electoral districts
 Past Canadian electoral districts

References

Campaign expense data from Elections Canada
Riding history from the Library of Parliament:
Verchères 1976-1998
Verchères—Les Patriotes 1998-2008
2011 Results from Elections Canada

Notes

Boucherville
Former federal electoral districts of Quebec
Sainte-Julie, Quebec
Varennes, Quebec
Marguerite-D'Youville Regional County Municipality
1976 establishments in Quebec
Constituencies established in 1976
2011 disestablishments in Quebec
Constituencies disestablished in 2011